The 2003–04 season was the 83rd season in the existence of CA Osasuna and the club's fourth consecutive season in the top flight of Spanish football. In addition to the domestic league, Osasuna participated in this season's edition of the Copa del Rey. The season covered the period from 1 July 2003 to 30 June 2004.

Competitions

Overview

La Liga

League table

Results summary

Results by round

Matches

Copa del Rey

References

CA Osasuna seasons
CA Osasuna